Pier Andrea Matteazzi (born 5 December 1997 in Vicenza) is an Italian swimmer, specialized in 400 m medley race. He competed at the 2020 Summer Olympics, in 400 m individual medley

His club is In Sport Rane Rosse and he is an athlete of the Centro Sportivo Olimpico dell’Esercito.

Career 
His first medal at a senior competition was won in 2017 (bronze medal with 4:20.88), the following year he won the silver medal with 4:17.21 and he participated to the 2018 Mediterranean Games in Tarragona, finishing 4th at 400 medley. He won his first Italian championships in 2019, with 4:15.73 and participates to Naples 2019 Summer Universiade. He established a new personal best with 4:15.02 in 2020, improved with 4:12.79 in 2021 for finishing 5th at the 2020 European Championships. He qualified for representing Italy at the 2020 Summer Games.

Day one of swimming at the 2022 European Aquatics Championships, in August in Rome, Matteazzi won the bronze medal in the 400 metre individual medley with a time of 4:13.29.

Reference

External links 
 

Living people
1997 births
Sportspeople from Vicenza
Italian male swimmers
Male medley swimmers
Competitors at the 2019 Summer Universiade
Swimmers at the 2020 Summer Olympics
Swimmers at the 2022 Mediterranean Games
Mediterranean Games gold medalists for Italy
Mediterranean Games bronze medalists for Italy
Mediterranean Games medalists in swimming
European Aquatics Championships medalists in swimming
20th-century Italian people
21st-century Italian people